Björn Johansson may refer to:
Björn Johansson (ice hockey) (born 1956), Swedish ice hockey defenceman
Björn Ola Marcus Johansson (born 1979), Swedish ice hockey defenceman
Björn Johansson (cyclist) (born 1963), Swedish cyclist
Bjorn Johansson Associates, employer of Aurelia Frick

See also
Bjorn Johansen (disambiguation)